Uridine triacetate (INN), formerly known as vistonuridine, is an orally active tri-acetylated prodrug of uridine used:
 in the treatment of hereditary orotic aciduria (brand name Xuriden  );
 to treat people following an overdose of chemotherapy drugs 5-fluorouracil (5-FU) or capecitabine regardless of the presence of symptoms, or who exhibit early-onset, severe or life-threatening toxicity affecting the cardiac or central nervous system, and/or early-onset, unusually severe adverse reactions (e.g., gastrointestinal toxicity and/or neutropenia) within 96 hours following the end of fluorouracil or capecitabine administration (brand name Vistogard).

Uridine triacetate was developed, manufactured and distributed by Wellstat Therapeutics. It was granted breakthrough therapy designation by the U.S. Food and Drug Administration (FDA) and approved for use in the United States in 2015.

References

External links
 

Acetate esters
Antidotes
Breakthrough therapy
Prodrugs